FK Pambiqci Neftcala was an Azerbaijani football club from Neftçala founded in 1992, and dissolved in 1997.

During their first season as a club they finished third in the Azerbaijan First Division, and followed this up the following season with a second place, missing out on promotion after losing to Polad Sumqayıt in the play-offs. The next season, 1993–94, they again finished second and achieved promotion to the Azerbaijan Top Division. Pambiqci Neftcala spent three seasons in the Top Division, finishing 9th, 11th and final 15th in the 1996–97 season, which they folded after the completion.

League and domestic cup history

References 

Pambiqci Neftcala
Association football clubs established in 1992
Defunct football clubs in Azerbaijan
Association football clubs disestablished in 1997